Positive News is a constructive journalism magazine. It publishes independent journalism and aims to help create a more inspiring news medium.

Format and circulation 
Positive News magazine is published quarterly in print with a circulation of 10,000 copies. It was originally printed in newspaper format, before relaunching as a magazine in January 2016. The magazine has an online edition, Positive.News.

Publisher 
Positive News is published by Positive News Publishing Ltd, a not-for-profit company based in London, United Kingdom. The company is a subsidiary of Positive News Limited, a community benefit society.

History 
Positive News was founded in 1993 by Shauna Crockett-Burrows (1930 – 2012) as a quarterly newspaper, and she soon after established Positive News Trust, a registered educational charity.

In 2015, Positive News editor-in-chief Sean Dagan Wood established a co-operative as the parent organisation of Positive News' publishing company. Supporters of Positive News were invited to become co-owners in the new co-operative, via a community share offer. Through its 30-day #OwnTheMedia crowdfunding campaign in June 2015, Positive News was invested in by more than 1,500 of its readers in 33 countries, age 18–89, raising more than £260,000. Positive News was the first media organisation in the world to offer community shares globally through crowdfunding. Its #OwnTheMedia campaign was also the first community share issue to run on the Crowdfunder UK online crowdfunding platform.

In January 2016, Positive News relaunched as a magazine with an increased emphasis on the quality of the journalism and of the design of the publication.

Constructive journalism 
Positive News has supported the establishment of similar publishing initiatives worldwide, including Noticias Positivas, which was founded in Argentina in 2003 by Andrea Méndez Brandam and in Spain in 2002 by the Asociación de Noticias Positivas, and which is independent of Positive News.

In 2014 Positive News in collaboration with the Constructive Journalism Project established 'constructive journalism' as a recognised field within the media industry in the United Kingdom, through delivering training programmes to journalists and journalism students. Positive News is among an increasing number of media organisations practising constructive journalism.

See also 
Constructive journalism
Yes!

References

External links 
Positive News
The Constructive Journalism Project
Noticias Positivas
The Positiv - Positive News

Citizen journalism
News media in the United Kingdom
Positive psychology
Quarterly magazines published in the United Kingdom
Quarterly journals